The flag of the short-lived Republic of Benin in Nigeria consists of the colours black, and green, with black taking up two-thirds of the flag. It was inspired by the flag of the now-defunct Republic of Biafra. The main difference was that Biafran flag was a tricolour of red, black, and green. As with the Biafran flag, it was charged in the centre with a golden rising sun but it did not have a golden bar below it.

See also
Flag of Biafra
Flag of the Kingdom of Benin

References

Biafra
Benin, Republic
Flags of Nigeria
Benin
Flags introduced in 1967